A black ribbon is a symbol of remembrance or mourning. It is often worn or put on a public display to express consolation.

Sign of mourning

Similar to a black armband, the black ribbon is a public display of grief. Individuals or organizations display the ribbon in commemoration of victims after specific incidents.

Some examples include:

 Black ribbons were worn and placed on doors after the May 1992 Westray Mine Disaster in Pictou County, Nova Scotia, Canada. 
 The ribbon was worn in the United Kingdom after the death of Diana, Princess of Wales in 1997.
 Students distributed black ribbons after the April 2007 Virginia Tech shooting at Virginia Tech in Blacksburg, Virginia.
 The black ribbon has been used by the journalists in the Philippines to condemn the killings of journalists on the Maguindanao massacre. 
 The 2013 London Marathon runners were given a black ribbon to wear to mark the Boston Marathon bombing.
The search engine Google, which often changes the company's logo to a Google Doodle commemorating timely events, has used the black ribbon to mark a number of incidents. These include the Charlie Hebdo shooting, the charter flight crash in Colombia in November 2016, the 2017 Portugal wildfires, and the  death of Queen Elizabeth II. April 9, 2017, Google Arabic displayed a black ribbon as a mark of respect and sympathy for victims of 2017 Palm Sunday church bombings in Tanta and Alexandria, Egypt.

To show sympathy for victims of the 2023 earthquake in Turkey and Syria, Turkish Wikipedia and Apple's website homepage in Turkey changed to show a glowing black ribbon atop a dark background.

Other meanings
 Melanoma awareness. Sometimes shown as black with white polka dots.
 In Argentina, a black ribbon, sometimes with the national flag's colours in both ends, is used to raise awareness about the victims of subversive terrorism.
 By the Anarchist Black Ribbon Campaign, a free speech campaign started in 1996 inspired by the Blue Ribbon Online Free Speech Campaign.
 During the 6th International Israeli Apartheid Week (IAW) the black ribbon was worn worldwide to show support and promote awareness of the Palestinian struggle.
 In India, 2011 to show support to Anna Hazare who was fasting to fight against corruption by government.
 Narcolepsy awareness.
 Worn by people who have suffered from any intentions of self harming on November 30 of every year.
 In New Zealand, a black ribbon with a koru symbol supports an end to domestic violence. In Australia, a black ribbon raises awareness against domestic abuse of men and fathers.

In fiction
 In the Discworld novels by Terry Pratchett, the black ribbon is instead worn by vampires to prove, in the vein of the real-world blue ribbon badge, that they have sworn never to drink blood again.

Variations

See also
 Black Ribbon Day
 Half-mast
 List of awareness ribbons

References

External links

 The TortureProtest.org Black Ribbon Campaign

Awareness ribbon
Ribbon, black
Grief